Simpkin is a surname. Notable people with the surname include: 

Anne Simpkin (born 1969), British tennis player
Chris Simpkin (born 1944), British footballer
George Simpkin (1943–2020), New Zealand rugby coach
Jake Simpkin (born 2001), Australian rugby player
Jonathan Simpkin (born 1987), Australian footballer
Jy Simpkin (born 1998), Australian footballer
Luke Simpkin (born 1979), British boxer 
Mark Simpkin (born 1972), English television presenter and businessman
Richard Simpkin (1921–1986), British Army officer
Tom Simpkin (born 1990), Australian footballer

See also 
 Simpkin (disambiguation)